Conflict of Interest is a legal/suspense thriller written by David Crump in 1997. A paperback edition was published by Strawberry Hill Press in that year.

Plot summary
(quoted from Amazon)

A propane truck falls from an overpass, killing dozens of innocent people on the freeway below. When Robert Kerrick, one of Houston's most respected trial lawyers, agrees to represent the families of the victims, a bizarre chain of events is set into motion that ultimately threatens his career, his family, even his life. Pitted against the ruthless lawyer Jimmy Coleman, partner in the mega-firm Booker & Baine, Herrick finds himself careening between black-tie balls and opulent private jets to an underworld populated by drug pushers and topless dancers. With hundreds of millions of dollars and his own life and practice at stake, one lawyer struggles to find justice for his clients even while a psychopathic murderer lurks in the shadows.

External links 
 Conflict of Interest at Amazon.com

American thriller novels
1997 American novels
Legal thriller novels
Novels set in Houston